Bryan Lamar Simmons (born April 4, 1987), professionally known as TM88 (also known as TrackMan 88), is an American record producer and DJ from Atlanta, Georgia. He is a member of the Atlanta-based record production and songwriting team 808 Mafia, as one of the lead members next to Southside. Simmons produced the global hit XO Tour Llif3. The track would go on to become Grammy nominated and one of the most streamed tracks on Spotify with around 1.5 billion streams as of July 2021.

Early life and career 
Bryan Lamar Simmons was born on April 4, 1987, in Miami, Florida. He lived in Eufaula, Alabama and later moved to Atlanta, Georgia.

In 2009, TM88, 22 at the time, started producing instrumentals for Slim Dunkin, an artist at Brick Squad Monopoly before his murder in late 2011. He was introduced to Southside, whom he started working with. Southside later invited him to join his production team 808 Mafia. In 2012, TM88 had his first major placement as a solo producer on Waka Flocka Flame's song "Lurkin" which was on his second studio album Triple F Life.

TM88 caught up in 2013 on significant mixtapes from rappers like Future. TM88 later worked with Gucci Mane and landed a placement on his ninth studio album Trap House III. He then got a production feature on Future's second studio album Honest on the track "Special" in 2014.

Discography

Albums

Mixtapes

EPs

Singles

As lead artist

As featured artist

Production discography

References

External links 
 
 

Record producers from Florida
Living people
1987 births
African-American record producers
Trap musicians
21st-century African-American people
20th-century African-American people
FL Studio users